Apigeninidin (Also, apigenidin, or Gesneridin) is a chemical compound belonging to the 3-deoxyanthocyanidins and that can be found in the Patagonian plant Ephedra frustillata and in the soybean. Apigeninidin is one of the principal pigments found in sorghum. Extremely high level of apigeninidin (49 mg/g) has been documented in sorghum leaf sheath. Like all anthocyanidins it exists in a variety of tautomers depending on pH and hydration, several of these bare the distinctive pyrylium core.

References 

Anthocyanidins
Resorcinols
Sorghum